The Journey (Chinese: 信约) is a Singaporean transmedia project about the story of Singapore, aired from 2013 to 2015. It consists of three parts: A Voyage, which is about the early settlers that arrived in Singapore, Tumultuous Times, which is about the Second World War, as well as Singapore's road to independence, and Our Homeland, which is about Singapore's progress as a nation, which is slated to wrap up  during Singapore's 50th birthday. The drama trilogy focuses on a fictional depiction of the events and lives of the people in each era.

Cast

Cast Timeline
Note: A gray cell indicates that the character did not appear in that medium.

Development
The dramas are the first periodical dramas in Singapore to use CGI. This is done with the help of 27 students from Diploma in Digital Visual Effects in Nanyang Polytechnic.

List of episodes

References

Singapore Chinese dramas
2013 Singaporean television series debuts
2014 Singaporean television series endings
2014 Singaporean television series debuts
2015 Singaporean television series endings
2015 Singaporean television series debuts
Channel 8 (Singapore) original programming